The Alamitos oil well #1 or Alamitos #1 is the site of a famous oil well in Signal Hill, California, the start of the Long Beach oilfield. The spot is also known as Porcupine Hill. The Alamitos well #1 was designated a California Historic Landmark (No. 580) on May 1, 1957. The Signal Hill oil discovered in 1921 became the black gold of Southern California. Alamitos #1 started drilling on March 23, 1921. The leader of the drilling was O.P. "Happy" Yowells. On June 23 at 9:30 a.m. the drill, at about 2,765 feet down, hit oil that was trapped under ground. The trapped oil was pressurized by natural gas. The pressure pushed the blowout oil 114 feet into the air, when the drill hit the oil. The drilling rig collapsed in the blowout. A new clean well was drilled nearby and started production on June 25, 1921. Alamitos oil well #1 put out 600 barrels a day and 700,000 barrels before running out.

In 1917 Union Oil Company had drilled near the area of Signal Hill and found no oil. Royal Dutch Shell Oil Company drilled Alamitos Well #1 and found the gusher. Alamitos Well #1 found one of the richest oil fields in the world. The Long Beach oilfield produced over 1 billion barrels of oil by 1984. The Long Beach oilfield is still in use and producing oil. In 2002 the oilfield pumped out 1.5 million barrels of oil.

Marker
A California Historic Landmark marker is at the northeast corner of Temple Avenue and Hill Street in Signal Hill. The marker on the site reads:

See also
California Historical Landmarks in Los Angeles County

References

California Historical Landmarks
1921 establishments in California
Signal Hill, California